Timo Antero Aaltonen (born 11 April 1969) is a 189-cm tall Finnish shot putter who weighs 130 kg and competes for Turun Urheiluliitto, which is the same club that Paavo Nurmi ran for. He competed and won a gold medal at the 2000 European Indoor Athletics Championships with a qualifying put of 20.57 m and a final put of 20.62 m.

Aaltonen was the 13th member to be inducted into the 20 meter club after he putted the shot 20.12 m in a competition on 20 June 1998 in Kuortane, Finland.

External links
 

1969 births
Living people
People from Vehmaa
Finnish male shot putters
Athletes (track and field) at the 2000 Summer Olympics
Olympic athletes of Finland
Sportspeople from Southwest Finland
20th-century Finnish people
21st-century Finnish people